The Go-Bundesliga is the German championship for teams for the game of Go. It consists of five Leagues, of which some are split.
The winner of the top league is German Team Go Champion.
The competition takes place mainly at the KGS Go Server, from season 2016-2017 on matches will also be played at Pandanet. Each team is based on a location in Germany. Four players of one team compete against four players of the opposing team.
The games are played on a monthly basis.

List of the German Team Go Champions

External links 
 German Go Bundesliga

References 

Go competitions in Europe
Competitions in Germany
Sports leagues established in 2006